The Benjamine Rucker House is a historic mansion in Rutherford County, Tennessee, U.S..

History
The house was built in 1832 for Benjamine Rucker, who inherited 300 acres from his father, settler James Rucker. Rucker was the owner of 200 slaves. During the American Civil War of 1861–1865, the house was ransacked by the Union Army. After the war, it was inherited by his daughter Sophie and her husband, Colonel William Francis Betty. Their daughter, Willie Betty Newman, became a painter in Paris and Nashville.

The house has been listed on the National Register of Historic Places since February 28, 1991.

References

Houses on the National Register of Historic Places in Tennessee
Greek Revival houses in Tennessee
Houses completed in 1832
Houses in Rutherford County, Tennessee
Antebellum architecture